The Monument to Despot Stefan Lazarević is in the village of Crkvine by Mladenovac, Serbia, in the courtyard of the church of St. prophet Elijah. It is a marble monument with a medieval record of the death of Despot Stefan Lazarević. It was declared a Monument of Culture of Exceptional Importance in 1979, and it is protected by the Republic of Serbia. The monument is a column of glazed white marble of height 186 cm, width 68 cm, and a thickness of 26 cm. The main inscription is written in calligraphic letters, on the monument's west side, below an engraved three-sided cross. The monument was erected by Lazarević's companion Đurađ Zubrović immediately after Lazarević's death in 1427.

A translation of the monument's inscription:

.

Gallery

See also 
 Monuments of Culture of Exceptional Importance
 Tourism in Serbia
 Stefan Lazarević

References 
 Regional Chamber of Požarevac, prepared by Dr. Novakovic Radmila Kostic, 2005. year.

External links 
 Spomen obeležje Despotu Stefanu Lazareviću SANU web-site, at www.spomenicikulture.mi.sanu.ac.rs 

15th-century establishments in Serbia
15th-century inscriptions
Lazarević dynasty
Tourism in Serbia
Historic sites in Serbia
1427 establishments in Europe
Architecture in Serbia
Cultural Monuments of Exceptional Importance (Serbia)
Medieval European sculptures